Wernicke is a surname, and may refer to

 Bjarne Wernicke-Olesen, Danish scholar
 Brian P. Wernicke (born 1958), American geologist
 Carl Wernicke (1848–1905), German physician 
 Catharine Wernicke (1789–1862), Danish pianist
 Christian Wernicke (1671–1725), German writer
 Eva-Maria Wernicke (born 1953), German luger
 Heinz Wernicke (1920–1944), German military officer 
 Herbert Wernicke (1946–2002), German opera director
 Hermann Wernicke (1851–1925), German entomologist
 Julia Wernicke (1860–1932), Argentine painter and engraver
 Kenneth Wernicke (1932–2022), American aerospace engineer
 Otto Wernicke (1893–1965), German actor
 Roberto Wernicke (1852–1922), Argentine physician

References

German-language surnames